HD 190007, also known as Gliese 775, is a star in the constellation of Aquila. Its apparent magnitude is 7.48. Parallax measurements by Gaia put the star at a distance of 41.5 light-years (12.74 parsecs) away.

HD 190007 is a BY Draconis variable.

Planetary system
The planetary candidate b on close orbit was first detected in 2020 by radial-velocity method.

References

External links
 Sol Station: http://www.solstation.com/stars3/100-ks.htm

Aquila (constellation)
K-type main-sequence stars
Durchmusterung objects
0775
190007
098698
Aquilae, V1654
Planetary systems with one confirmed planet